Innisfallen Castle and grounds is a heritage-listed mansion located at 14 Cherry Place, Castle Cove, City of Willoughby, New South Wales, Australia. The property is privately owned. It was added to the New South Wales State Heritage Register on 2 April 1999.

History 

The mansion was built during 1903-1905 by Henry Hastings Willis, a former Member and Speaker of the Parliament of New South Wales. The house was named in honour of a ruined abbey at Killarney, Ireland.

Heritage listing 
Innisfallen Castle and Grounds was listed on the New South Wales State Heritage Register on 2 April 1999.

See also 

Australian residential architectural styles

References

Attribution

External links

New South Wales State Heritage Register
Houses in New South Wales
Articles incorporating text from the New South Wales State Heritage Register
1900s establishments in Australia
Houses completed in 1805